Craig Doerge (born December 4, 1944) is an American keyboard player, session musician, songwriter, and record producer, best known for his keyboard work with Crosby Stills and Nash, James Taylor, and Jackson Browne.

Biography
He was born in Cleveland, Ohio, United States. Doerge (rhymes with Fergie) had an R&B band through college at Hartford, Connecticut, and then moved to Laurel Canyon, Los Angeles in the late-1960s to work as a studio player and songwriter with A&M Records, and with Jim Keltner, Larry Carlton, and others playing on early Kenny Rogers First Edition tracks, The Challengers, and cartoon shows, ("Groovy Ghoolies" and "Fat Albert"). After appearing on the Frank Zappa production, The GTOs' album Permanent Damage, he teamed up with Judy Henske, Jerry Yester and Jon Sieter, in the band Rosebud, marrying Henske in 1973.

From the early 1970s he appeared on many sessions. Initially these included albums by Lee Hazlewood and Linda Ronstadt, and he also recorded a solo album for Columbia Records in 1973. Aside from a principal role as keyboardist in the recordings of Crosby, Stills and Nash, James Taylor, and Jackson Browne, he has played on albums by Gene Clark, Carly Simon, The Temptations, Shawn Phillips, Donovan, Mimi Farina and Tom Jans, Willie Nelson, Barbra Streisand, Johnny Hallyday, to name a few.

He was a founding member of The Section, a session supergroup, with Danny Kortchmar, Leland Sklar and Russ Kunkel, which recorded three mostly instrumental LPs in the early to mid-1970s. This band continued through the 1980s in recordings and as a touring back-up band for Crosby, Stills and Nash, James Taylor and Jackson Browne.

Doerge has also collaborated as a songwriter with Jackson Browne, David Crosby, Graham Nash, Paul Williams and others, and has worked on movie soundtracks. He won a Grammy Award for his participation as co-writer with Paul Williams and their song, "Life Goes On", sung in Lena Horne's Tony Award winning Broadway show, Lena. He was nominated for another Grammy in the blues category for the song, "World in Motion", co-written with Jackson Browne, and performed by Pops Staples. In recent years he has written the music for, and produced, two albums for his wife and lyricist, Judy Henske.

"Yellow Beach Umbrella," the lead track on Doerge's 1973 eponymous debut album, co-written with Henske, was recorded in 1976 by Three Dog Night on their American Pastime LP, by Andy Williams on his Andy LP, and by Bette Midler on her 1977 Broken Blossom LP, as well as by Libby Titus and Perry Como.

Partial discography

As an artist
 Rosebud, Reprise Records RS-6426
 Craig Doerge, Columbia A1-32179
 The Section, Warner Brothers BS-2662
 Forward Motion, The Section, Warner Bros. BS-2714
 Fork It Over, The Section, Capitol ST-11656

As a sideman

With James Taylor
 One Man Dog, Warner Brothers BS-2660
 Greatest Hits, Warner Bros BSK-3113
 In the Pocket, Warner Bros BS-2912

With Jackson Browne
 Jackson Browne, Asylum SD-5051
 For Everyman, Asylum SD-5067-A
 The Pretender, Asylum 7E-1079-A
 Running on Empty, Asylum 6E-113-A-SP
 Hold Out, Asylum 5E-511-A
 Lawyers in Love, Asylm EA-60268-A
 Lives in the Balance, Asylum EA-60457
 World in Motion, Asylum

With Crosby & Nash
 Graham Nash David Crosby (The "Black album"), Atlantic SD-7220
 Wind on the Water, ABC Records ABCD-902
 Whistling Down the Wire, ABC Records ABCD-956
 Crosby & Nash Live, ABC Records ABCD-1042
 The Best of Crosby & Nash, ABC Records AA-1102

With Crosby, Stills & Nash 
 CSN, Atlantic SD-19104
 Daylight Again, Atlantic SD-19360
 Allies, Atlantic 88075-1
 Live It Up, Crosby Stills & Nash, Atlantic Records 82107-1

With Crosby, Stills, Nash & Young
 American Dream, Atlantic 81888-2

With other artists (partial list)
 Phoebe Snow, Rock Away, Atlantic WTG-19197
 Phantom of Paradise soundtrack, A&M SP-3653
 No Nukes, The Muse concerts-New York, Asylim ML-801-B
 Linda Ronstadt, Don't Cry Now, Asylum SD-5064
 Frank Zappa and The GTOs, Permanent Damage, Straight Records S-1059]
 Patti Dahlstrom, The Way I Am, 20th Century T-421
 Craig Fuller & Eric Kaz, Columbia AL-35324

As record producer
 Rich Kids, soundtrack and eight songs with Allan F. Nicholls for the Robert Altman movie production
 Graham Nash, Innocent Eyes, co-produced with Graham Nash and Stanley Johnston, Atlantic 816331
 CSN, Daylight Again, co-production on two cuts: "Delta", and "Might as Well Have A Good Time"
 "Step by Step", co-producer with J.D. Souther. J.D. Souther & Karla Bonoff from the movie, About Last Night (1986 film)
 David Crosby, Oh Yes I Can, co producer with Stanley Johnston and David Crosby
 Judy Henske, producer, Loose in the World, Fair Star 8323
 Judy Henske, producer, She Sang California, Fair Star 8393
 Judy Henske, production (10 songs) co-produced box set with Cheryl Pawelski, Big Judy: How Far This Music Goes 1962-2004, Rhino Handmade 7726

References

External links
Short biography on Judy Henske's site
Craig Doerge Interview NAMM Oral History Library (2019)

1944 births
Living people
American session musicians
American pop pianists
American rock pianists
American male pianists
American male organists
20th-century American keyboardists
Songwriters from Ohio
Musicians from Cleveland
20th-century American pianists
21st-century American keyboardists
21st-century American pianists
21st-century organists
20th-century American male musicians
21st-century American male musicians
Rosebud (band) members
American male songwriters
American organists